John Fleming, 2nd Lord Fleming (c. 1465 – 1 November 1524) was a Scottish nobleman.

He was the son of Malcolm Fleming, 1st Lord Fleming, and Euphame Livingstone, a daughter of James Livingston, 1st Lord Livingston. He was assassinated by John Tweedie of Drumelzier, and his followers, while hawking.

His son was Malcolm Fleming, 3rd Lord Fleming.

References

The Complete Peerage of England, Scotland, Ireland, Great Britain, and the United Kingdom Extant, Extinct, or Dormant; first edition by George Edward Cokayne, Clarenceux King of Arms

1460s births
1524 deaths
16th-century Scottish people
Lord Chamberlains of Scotland
Lords of Parliament (pre-1707)